Sherborn may refer to:

Places:
Sherborn, Massachusetts, United States

People:
 Charles Davies Sherborn (1861–1942), British bibliographer, paleontologist and geologist
 Charles William Sherborn (1831–1916), British engraver
 Derek Sherborn (1924–2004), British cultural conservationist 
 Richard Sherborn, 16th century English politician

See also
Sherborne (disambiguation)
Sherbourne (disambiguation)